Kevin Ellis (born 14 October 1944) is  a former Australian rules footballer who played with Fitzroy in the Victorian Football League (VFL).

Notes

External links 		
		
		
		
		
		
		
Living people		
1944 births		
		
Australian rules footballers from Victoria (Australia)		
Fitzroy Football Club players